Kobuleti Managed Reserve is a protected area in Kobuleti Municipality, Adjara region of Georgia along the Black Sea coast in the northern part of the resort town Kobuleti.  
Kobuleti Protected Areas  were  established in 1998 to preserve  unique wetland ecosystems recognized by the Ramsar Convention.

Kobuleti Protected Areas include Kobuleti Managed Reserve and Kobuleti Strict Nature Reserve located on left and right banks of Shavi Ghele (black creek) river respectively.

Geography 
Reserve has flat surface with minor erosion by the rivers of Shavi Ghele  and Togoni and by a few water drains. It is apeat bog, consisting mainly of peat moss with hardly noticeable surface elevations which are called locally peat domes. These minor elevations rise 1–3 m above it surroundings. The bog in this area is composed of a single peat layer with thickness from 5 m up to 9 m.

History and culture 
Kabuleti is an ancient cultural and trading center with many tourist attractions. 
In late antiquity  major trading routes where crisscrossing in Kobuleti. Christianity was introduced here by St. Andrew the Apostle in the 1st century.

Since the 1950s local population started building sophisticated houses with huge stairs and balconies. The  size of the  house was indicative to well-being of the family and represented major investment. Villages around Kobuleti till present day has examples of traditional Achara and Lazeti dwellings. In vicinity of Kobuleti there are ruins of castles and bridges from early middle ages.

Tourist attraction 
Kobuleti Managed Reserve arranged trails, so that visitors can carry out educational tours. It is possible to rent skis and walk along sphagnum bog.

See also 
 Kobuleti Strict Nature Reserve

References 

Managed reserves of Georgia (country)
Protected areas established in 1998
Geography of Adjara
Tourist attractions in Adjara